Tahesha Way (née Wright; born December 31, 1969) is an American Democratic Party politician, New Jersey's 34th Secretary of State, and a former member of the Board of Chosen Freeholders as Freeholder Director in Passaic County, New Jersey, United States.

Biography
Way grew up in The Bronx. She earned two degrees: one in English and American literature from Brown University, and the other in law from the University of Virginia. She worked as a law clerk, a television producer for Court TV, and a literature professor at Fairleigh Dickinson University before her current position. She also worked as an attorney with a Totowa law firm. Way was admitted to the state bar in 1998. Way was defeated along with running mates Evangeline Gomez and Domenick Stampone in the 2009 election, where the Republicans gained three seats that were previously held by Democrats. In December 2017, Governor-elect Phil Murphy selected Way as the next Secretary of State of New Jersey. She was sworn in as New Jersey's 34th Secretary of State on February 26, 2018. She lives in Wayne with her husband, former New York Giants running back Charles Way, and 4 children.

References

1969 births
Living people
21st-century American politicians
21st-century American women politicians
African-American people in New Jersey politics
African-American state cabinet secretaries
Brown University alumni
County commissioners in New Jersey
Fairleigh Dickinson University faculty
New Jersey Democrats
People from the Bronx
People from Wayne, New Jersey
Secretaries of State of New Jersey
American women academics
21st-century African-American women
21st-century African-American politicians
20th-century African-American people
20th-century African-American women